Accidents Happen is a 2009 Australian coming-of-age comedy drama film directed by Andrew Lancaster and starring Geena Davis, Harrison Gilbertson, Harry Cook, Sebastian Gregory, Joel Tobeck, and Sarah Woods. Written by Brian Carbee, based on his own childhood and adolescence, the story revolves around an accident-prone teenage boy and his family. The film was shot in Sydney, New South Wales, over June – July 2008, and opened in Australia on 22 April 2010.

At the ARIA Music Awards of 2010 the soundtrack was nominated for ARIA Award for Best Original Soundtrack, Cast or Show Album.

Plot 
In 1974, the Conway family are at a drive-in theater in Connecticut watching The Three Stooges. The parents are Gloria (Geena Davis), a foul-mouthed and strict mother who will always take responsibility over the family, Ray (Joel Tobeck), an easy-going father, and siblings Linda, Gene, Larry (Harry Cook), and Billy (Harrison Gilbertson), who is an accident-prone child. In the meantime, the Conways' neighbor, Douglas "Doug" Post (Sebastian Gregory), whom Gloria hates and often calls him names because he is the one who causes problems that could be offensive towards the family, drives by on his bike, and Gene leads him up to the top of the drive-in screen. Gene then proceeds to urinate out of the screen. While an infuriated Gloria trips as she approaches the screen, infuriated and confused guests honk at Gene and Doug. While driving back home in the rain, an argument among two of the children distracts Ray, causing the car to collide with a pick-up truck. Although Gloria, Ray, Billy, and Larry suffer only minor injuries, Linda is killed and Gene is severely injured, leaving him brain damaged and paralyzed from the head down.

In 1982, eight years after the accident, Ray is divorced and more problems arise concerning Doug and Gene's condition, which could cause his death at any time. Fifteen-year-old Billy is still friends with Doug even after the accident. One night, an argument occurs over a TV dinner with Larry, now a belligerent and profane alcoholic. Billy accidentally knocks over the dinner and it lands on him, burning his back. When Doug overhears what is going on, he intervenes and gets into a short scuffle with Larry, as Billy blames his brother for the burn on his back. After streaking and robbing a convenience store, Billy and Doug are playing when he causes an almighty crash with a bowling ball and a moving car, killing Doug's father. Just a few days after the incident, Larry's incessant harassment causes Billy to fight against his older brother, and when Gloria breaks up the scuffle and discovers a gauze on Billy's back (after Billy knocked the TV dinner and injured himself, and on the newspapers regarding the robbery that Billy was wearing the gauze), Larry immediately tells her that Billy and Doug went streaking and stealing things as evidence, but is still taken away by Ray, who came to cause another argument with Gloria over their divorce. Because Billy has no way to hide any of the evidence, an incensed Gloria reprimands and admonishes him, permanently forbidding him from seeing Doug. Although she knows what Billy and Doug did, Gloria does not know they caused the car crash that killed Doug's father.

When Doug receives a mistaken note that his father committed suicide and that the insurance company does not pay for suicide, they decide that it is time to confess to the police as to what really happened. When Billy tells this to Gloria, she describes him as a selfish son and she slaps him across the face in disbelief and breaks down in tears. As the police interrogate Billy and Doug, the family receive word that Gene had finally died. It is then revealed that when Doug attended Gene's funeral, Gloria had forgiven him for what happened. The movie ends when Billy takes the bowling ball that was found after the fatal accident and rolls it down the sidewalk as Billy looks on.

Cast 
 Geena Davis as Gloria Conway
 Harrison Gilbertson as Billy Conway
 Harry Cook as Larry Conway
 Ivy Latimer as Linda Conway
 Joel Tobeck as Ray Conway
 Sebastian Gregory as Doug Post
 Sarah Woods as Dottie Post
 Erik Thomson as Bob
 Rebecca Massey as Louise
 Morgan Griffin as Katrina
 Wendy Playfair as Mrs. Smolensky

Production 
American-born screenwriter Brian Carbee wrote Accidents Happen based on his childhood in 1980s Connecticut, changing his own name to "Billy Conway". He had previously performed in a one person show titled In Search of Mike, which director Andrew Lancaster saw and asked Carbee if he would adapt the show to a short film. Carbee subsequently wrote a novel which served as the basis for his Accidents Happen screenplay. He developed the screenplay through the prestigious Aurora Script Workshop in Sydney, where producer Anthony Anderson had worked and collaborated on his 2004 film Somersault. In 2004, the completed script was nominated for an Australian Inside Film Award for Best Unproduced Screenplay, but it took a further three years to gather finances for the project. Anderson, Carbee and Lancaster successfully applied for funding from Screen Australia on two occasions; they were granted A$18,000 in May 2003 to fund drafts of the script, and $50,000 in November 2007. In September 2005, Anderson traveled to New York City with three other Australian producers to meet with investors at No Borders Co-Production Market, a division of the Independent Feature Project Market in which filmmakers attempt to secure financing for their projects. The film was the first production from the Abacus Film Fund, co-founded by producer Heather Ogilvie and corporate advisers BG Capital Corporation. British production company Bankside Films of London also assisted in raising finances and is handling all international sales of the film. The filmmakers received a 40% rebate on all production costs from Screen Australia. Davis was the only American actor to be cast, in spite of the story's American setting; the rest of the cast is Australian, with feigned American accents.

Accidents Happen was originally intended to be filmed in Connecticut, where it is set, but production remained in Australia, where the script had been written, because finances were easier to raise than in the United States. Filming was slated to begin in April 2008 but was delayed until June. Lancaster said that he did "a huge amount of technical preparation" before filming began, so that on the set, he could focus his directing on the actors' performances, since the cast were largely inexperienced. Principal photography commenced in early June with scenes shot on a built set at Sydney's Fox Studios. Most filming took place in and around Kuringgai, first on Gillian Parade in West Pymble for a week in late June and then Lincoln St, St Ives for 1–2 July. Lincoln St residents complained about possible disruptions to Ku-ring-gai Council, starting a petition to have production moved elsewhere, and threatening to play bagpipes and wave lights around during filming if it went on as planned. The council then offered a revised filming schedule, cutting filming down by two days and bringing each day's finishing time forward by an hour to 12:30 am, and the producers offered some residents a $500 payment to cover any inconveniences. Filming of the story's integral car-crash scene was relocated to another street after the discord.

Release 
Select footage of Accidents Happen was screened to potential distributors at the 2008 Toronto International Film Festival and was shown at the American Film Market in November 2008. The final cut of the film had its world premiere on 23 April 2009 at the Tribeca Film Festival and was screened in June 2009 at the Sydney Film Festival. It was shown in October 2009 at the Branchage Jersey Film Festival, the Cinéma des Antipodes festival in Saint Tropez, and the Sitges Film Festival.

Box office 
Accidents Happen took in $157,131 at the box office in Australia.

Reception 
Rotten Tomatoes, a review aggregator, reports that six of ten surveyed critics gave the film a positive review; the average rating was 5.5/10. Russell Edwards of Variety wrote, "John Irving-style mishaps and labored irony fail to maintain drama or coherence in Accidents Happen, an Australian-made, faux-American dysfunctional-family black comedy."

See also 
 Cinema of Australia

References

External links 
 
 
 
 

2009 films
2009 black comedy films
2000s coming-of-age comedy-drama films
Australian black comedy films
Australian coming-of-age comedy-drama films
British black comedy films
British coming-of-age comedy-drama films
Films shot in Sydney
Films set in 1974
Films set in 1982
2000s English-language films
2000s British films